III is the third studio album by American rock band Fuzz, released on October 23, 2020 on In the Red Records. The album was produced by Steve Albini. The first single from the album, "Returning", was released on July 22, 2020.

Track listing

References

Fuzz (band) albums
2020 albums
albums produced by Steve Albini
In the Red Records albums